The following is a list of the current rosters of the Champions Indoor Football (CIF).

Omaha Beef

Salina Liberty

Sioux City Bandits

American football-related lists
 
Champions Indoor Football